The Annunciation is a painting by the Flemish artist Michaelina Wautier. It is dated 1659, and is one of Wautier's last known paintings.

It now hangs in the gallery at Marly-le-Roi in France.

References 

Annunciation
1659 paintings
Wautier